George Wyndham, 1st Baron Leconfield (5 June 1787 – 18 March 1869), was a British soldier and peer.

A direct descendant of Sir John Wyndham, he was the eldest natural son of George O'Brien Wyndham, 3rd Earl of Egremont, and Elizabeth Ilive. His parents were married in 1801 but had no sons after their marriage.

George Wyndham entered the Royal Navy in 1799 as a midshipman in HMS Amelia. In 1802 he transferred to the Army as a cornet in the 5th Dragoon Guards, promoted in 1803 to lieutenant in the 3rd Dragoon Guards. In 1805 he was a captain in the 72nd Highlanders and ADC to Sir Eyre Coote who was Lieutenant Governor of Jamaica. In 1807 he was DAAG to Earl Cathcart at the Bombardment of Copenhagen; in 1809, as captain in the 1st Foot Guards, he took part in the Walcheren Expedition; in 1811 he was a major in the 78th Regiment and the 12th Light Dragoons; and in 1812 he was lieutenant-colonel commanding the 20th Light Dragoons at the siege of Ciudad Rodrigo.

The earldom of Egremont became extinct on the death of the 4th Earl of Egremont in 1845 and this George Wyndham was adopted as the heir to the substantial Egremont estates, including Petworth House in Sussex. In 1859 he was raised to the peerage as Baron Leconfield, of Leconfield in the East Riding of the County of York.

During the Great Irish Famine, Col. George Wyndham was often in residence in his County Clare estate near Ennis where he assisted tenants who wanted to emigrate to Canada. This was a continuation of his father's improving policies in Sussex. In late 1849 and early 1850, a series of seven anonymous essays and illustrations concerning the famine appeared in the Illustrated London News under the title "Condition of Ireland: Illustrations of the New Poor Law." Here the narrator (likely the journalist and philanthropist Sidney Godolphin Osborne) writes of Col. Wyndham that "Colonel Windham . . . is not tired of his fellow-creatures, and does not seek to exterminate them. Not a roofless house did I see here." His property was a "little oasis of humanity in the desert of misery."

George Wyndham married Mary Fanny Blunt, daughter of Reverend William Blunt, in 1815. He died in March 1869, aged 81, and was succeeded in the barony by his eldest surviving son Henry. His third son, the Hon. Percy Scawen Wyndham, was the father of the politician and man of letters George Wyndham. His daughter, Hon. Caroline Sophia Wyndham (b. 12 Jul 1829, d. 19 Mar 1852) married Colonel Sir Robert Nigel Fitzhardinge Kingscote on 13 March 1851 at Petworth, Sussex. She died giving birth and is buried with her still-born child in the family vault at Bartons Lane Cemetery, Petworth, West Sussex.

See also
Earl of Egremont

References
Charles Mosley (ed.), Burke's Peerage & Baronetage, 106th edition, 1999, entry "Egremont"

1787 births
1869 deaths
Barons in the Peerage of the United Kingdom
George
5th Dragoon Guards officers
3rd Dragoon Guards officers
72nd Highlanders officers
Grenadier Guards officers
78th Highlanders officers
12th Royal Lancers officers
20th Hussars officers
Peers of the United Kingdom created by Queen Victoria